Evening Star is an album by guitarist Joshua Breakstone that was recorded in 1990 and first released by the Contemporary label.

Reception 

In his review on AllMusic, Scott Yanow states "guitarist Joshua Breakstone utilizes two well-respected veterans (trombonist Jimmy Knepper and pianist Tommy Flanagan) on a quintet set, along with two younger players  ... The guitarist's single-note solos often make him seem like a horn player, so he never clashes with the pianist. It is a special treat getting to hear the under-recorded Jimmy Knepper stretching out".

Track listing 
 "The Thumb" (Wes Montgomery) – 7:10
 "I Know Why" (Harry Warren, Mack Gordon) – 6:51
 "The Way You Look Tonight" (Jerome Kern, Dorothy Fields) – 8:13
 "Child's Play" (Joshua Breakstone) – 7:12
 "Evening Star" (Benny Carter) – 7:29
 "Just Open Your Heart" (Barry Harris) – 7:39

Personnel 
Joshua Breakstone – guitar
Jimmy Knepper – trombone
Tommy Flanagan – piano
David Shapiro – bass 
Keith Copeland – drums

References 

Joshua Breakstone albums
1988 albums
Contemporary Records albums
Albums recorded at Van Gelder Studio
Albums produced by Bob Porter (record producer)